Terry Mixon (born November 2, 1964) is an American science fiction author. He is the author of the Empire of Bones and the Humanity Unlimited series, as well as other works, and  short stories. His work has appeared in several anthologies.

Mixon served as a non-commissioned officer in the United States Army 101st Airborne Division. He also worked alongside the flight controllers at the NASA Johnson Space Center.

Mixon is a science fiction genre podcaster and co-host of the "Dead Robots Society" Podcast. He is a proponent of authors releasing their work independent of traditional publishers, and advocates for the 'indie' model of book distribution regularly on the Dead Robots Society podcast and in interviews.

In 2014, Mixon released the first book in the Empire of Bones series: Empire of Bones.

Works

Empire of Bones Saga
 Empire of Bones (2014) 
 Veil of Shadows (2014)
 Command Decisions' (2015)
 Ghosts of Empire (2015)
 Paying the Price (2016)
 Reconnaissance in Force (2016)
 Behind Enemy Lines (2017)
 The Terra Gambit (2018)
 Hidden Enemies (2018)
 Race to Terra (2019)
 Ruined Terra (2019)
 Victory on Terra (2020)When Luck Runs Out (2020)Gunboat Diplomacy (2021)The Imperial Marines Saga
 Spoils of War (2020)Imperial Recruit (2021)

The Humanity Unlimited Saga
 Liberty Station (2015) 
 Freedom Express (2016)
 Tree of Liberty (2017)
 Blood of Patriots (2019)

Fractured Republic Series
 Storm Divers (2016)

Omnibus Volumes
 The Empire of Bones Saga Volume 1 (2017)
 The Empire of Bones Saga Volume 2 (2018)
 The Empire of Bones Saga Volume 3 (2020)
 Humanity Unlimited Publisher’s Pack 1 (2020)

The Vigilante Series with Glynn Stewart
 Heart of Vengeance (2017)
 Oath of Vengeance (2017)
 Bound By Law (2018) 
 Bound By Honor (2018) 
 Bound By Blood (2019)

Contributor
 "An Eye for an Eye" in Dirty Magick: Los Angeles, edited by Neal Pollack and Richard Rayner (2013)
 "Blood Debt", in Dirty Magick: New Orleans, edited by Charlie Brown (2015)

Other Works by Terry Mixon
 War Fish, (2013)
 The Man Who Stole History'', (2013)

References

External links
Official Site, run by the author
Dead Robots Society podcast, cohosted by the author
Terry Mixon on LibraryThing

American science fiction writers
American podcasters
1964 births
Living people